Oak Street Beach is located on North Lake Shore Drive in Chicago, Illinois, on the shore of Lake Michigan.  One of a series of Chicago beaches, the Chicago Park District defines Oak Street Beach as the area from approximately 1550 North Lake Shore Drive to 500 North Lake Shore Drive, excluding Ohio Street Beach, the South Ledge, a concrete path running from Ohio Street beach to the Oak Street Curve, Oak Street Beachstro Restaurant, Oak Street Beach proper, the North Ledge, and a concrete path running from Oak Street Beach to North Avenue Beach.

History

Up until the late 1800s the Lake Shore sloped from Oak Street to the Chicago river in a much gentler fashion. However the construction of a shipping pier at the river led to a build up of sand and silt just to the north.  As the land rose up out of the water squatters began to take residence, leading to disputes with lakefront property owners.

The biggest series of clashes surrounded a man named George Streeter in 1886. Streeter's boat, with passengers and cargo, became stranded on the sandbar created by the pier. As he unloaded waste and cargo, he created a small island. Eventually he persuaded people to dump more there, and claimed a sizable island. However the city would not stand for it, and after legal battles (some of which included gun fights) Streeter was evicted and the land, which was eventually filled in, became part of Chicago and became known as Streeterville.

Oak Street Beach was formed by sand washing up against the northern side of Streeterville.  Originally, it was under control of the Lincoln Park District, one of several districts in the city that were consolidated in 1934 to create the Chicago Park District.

Through the 1960s the sand area of Oak Street covered more than twice the area it does now, and the water was as much as three feet higher than its current level. The beach was popular for residents and tourists as a summer social spot near down town.

Cultural impact
A radio advertisement for mattresses, in the 1970s, featured a child reading a letter he was writing to the Sandman. The punch line was the child asking, "Is it true you get all your sand from Oak Street Beach?"

Chicago pop-punk band Knuckle Puck released a song titled "Oak Street" on their "While I Stay Secluded" EP.

Chicago hip-hop artist Chance The Rapper mentions Oak Street Beach in the third verse of his song, Windows.

Gallery

See also
Beaches in Chicago
Lincoln Park

Parks in Chicago
Beaches of Cook County, Illinois
Beaches of Illinois